The Battle of Firaz took place in late 633 or January 634 AD between the Rashidun Caliphate and the combined forces of the Byzantine Empire and the Sasanian Empire.  The battle resulted in a victory for the Arabs and concluded the First Arab Invasion of Mesopotamia.

Background

By the end of 633, the Muslims were the masters of the Euphrates valley. In this valley, Firaz at the outermost edge of the Persian Empire still had a Persian garrison. Khalid decided to drive away the Persians from this outpost as well fearing that the Persians would execute a well planned re-invasion of lost territory. He marched to Firaz with a Muslim force and arrived there in the first week of December 633. Firaz was the frontier between the empires of Persia and Byzantium, and the garrisons of the Persians as well as the Byzantines were cantoned there. In the face of the Muslims, the Byzantine garrison decided to come to the aid of the Persian garrison.

The battle
Khalid gave the enemy the option to cross the Euphrates. As soon as the enemy had crossed the Euphrates, Khalid commanded the Muslim force to go into action. The united forces of the Persians and the Byzantines had the river at their back. At Firaz, Khalid adopted the same tactics as he had adopted at Mazar. As the front ranks of both the forces committed themselves in the fighting, Khalid fixed his enemy on either flank with the help of his rear wings. Making a swift movement, the Muslims dashed for the bridge on the river, and succeeded in occupying it. The enemy was thus held in a pincer movement.

Aftermath
Sir William Muir, noted that the casualties of the coalition army "must be a great number, since the traditional accounts placed their casualties at fabulous number of 100.000 death" as the remaining fleeting soldiers were pursued and cut down by the cavalry of Rashidun. However, the reliability of the account of this battle has been questioned as the only sources appear to be those derived from accounts of Khalid centuries later. According to Peter Crawford, Heraclius could not have provided a garrison along the Euphrates of such a scale so that the opposition against Khalid in Firaz numbered tenfold against the Arab force and it is possible the Byzantines at that point would have still seen the Arab incursion as a mere raid against Persian land.

Khalid's oath
There is an Islamic legend, which runs as follows:

At the beginning of the battle of Firaz when the odds appeared to be against the Muslims, Khalid undertook an oath that if he was victorious, he would undertake pilgrimage (Hajj) to Mecca, the House of God. After the victory of Firaz, Khalid stayed at Firaz for some days and made the necessary arrangements for the administration of the territory. In January 634, while a garrison was kept at Firaz, orders were issued to the main Muslim army to return to Al-Hirah. Khalid stayed behind with the rear of the army. As the army moved forward on the road to Al Hirah, Khalid separated himself from the army and took an unfrequented route to Mecca with a small escort. Khalid reached Mecca in time to perform the Hajj. After performing the pilgrimage secretly and fulfilling his vow, Khalid and his party rode back to Al Hirah. Before the last contingent of the main army from Firaz had entered Hirah, Khalid was also there, as if he had been all the time with the rear guard.

References

Sources 
 
 
 Tabari, Abu Jaafar, Mohammed bin Jarir, Tarikh ar Rusul wal Mulk, Volume II

Further reading
A.I. Akram, The Sword of Allah: Khalid bin al-Waleed, His Life and Campaigns Lahore, 1969

Battles of Khalid ibn Walid
Battles involving the Rashidun Caliphate

Battles involving the Sasanian Empire
Battles involving the Byzantine Empire
Battles of the Arab–Byzantine wars
Muslim conquest of Mesopotamia
634
630s in the Byzantine Empire
7th century in Iran